The list of NCAA major college football yearly punt and kickoff return leaders identifies the major college leaders for each season from 1939 to the present. It includes yearly leaders in four statistical categories: (1) total punt return yardage, and (2) yards per punt return, (3) total kickoff return yardage, and (4) yards per kickoff return.  Prior to 1970, the NCAA determined the punt and kickoff return champions based on total yardage.  Starting in 1970, the return champions were determined based on yards per return. Unless otherwise noted, return champions and yardage totals for the years 1939 to 2021 are taken from the NCAA's "Football Bowl Subdivision Records" publication.

Return leaders
Key
† = Winner of that year's Heisman Trophy
Bold = Figure established an NCAA major college record

References

Return